Mohibullah Oryakhel is an Afghan cricketer. He is Right-handed batsman and Right-arm medium fast bowler. He represented Afghanistan in 2012 ICC Under-19 Cricket World Cup.

He made his ODI debut against Scotland on 6 March 2013.

External links
Mohibullah Oryakhel at ESPNcricinfo

References

1992 births
Living people
Afghan cricketers
Afghanistan One Day International cricketers
Sportspeople from Baghlan